Frederik Gottschalk von Haxthausen (14 July 1750 – 6 July 1825) was a Danish-Norwegian army officer, councillor of state, cabinet member and the country's first minister of finance.

Biography

Haxthausen was born in Copenhagen, Denmark, came to Norway in 1773 as a first lieutenant of Søndenfjeldske regiment, and rose to the rank of captain and company commander in 1779 and major in 1788. In 1789 he was appointed generalkrigskommissær, the officer in charge of national  conscription, and in 1802 became the director of the War Academy (Krigsskolen). In 1806 he became the commanding officer of Akershus fortress, a charge he held until 1814.
He spent the years 1808–1810 in Denmark as head of the war commissariate, but retained nonetheless all of his Norwegian posts.  Haxthausen had a major influence on Prince Christian Frederick as viceroy (stattholder) of Norway from 1813, joined the interim government of Christian Frederick in March 1814, and on 19 May 1814 he became Minister of Finance in the first cabinet of independent Norway.

During the Swedish campaign against Norway in 1814 he served as a lieutenant general, but was wrongly accused of being a traitor, and on 19 August, 5 days after the Convention of Moss, his house and garden was attacked by a mob. Haxthausen had to flee the town and withdrew from all his positions. In 1816 an impeachment process cleared him.

After 1814, the Akershus fortress went out of operative military use, so that Haxthausen was the last operative commander of the fortress.  He died in Christiania.

In 1879, a street of Oslo in the Frogner area close to his home was named after Haxthausen.

References

Sources
 Aschehougs konversasjonsleksikon, Vol. 9, Oslo (1957), H.Aschehoug & co.
 Oslo byleksikon

External links

Government ministers of Norway
1750 births
1825 deaths
People from Copenhagen
19th-century Norwegian politicians
Ministers of Finance of Norway
Norwegian Army generals
Norwegian military personnel of the Napoleonic Wars